Oca is a former Ancient city and bishopric in present Anatolia (Asiatic Turkey), restored as a Latin titular see.

Its site is located in Biga district of Çanakkale Province.

Ancient history 
Oca was a city in the Roman province of Hellespontus, in Asia Minor.
 
It was a bishopric, suffragan of the Metropolitan Archdiocese of Cyzicus.

Titular see 
It was nominally restored as a Latin titular bishopric of the lowest (Episcopal) rank in 1933.

No incumbents are recorded yet.

See also 
 Mysia

Sources and external links 
 GigaCatholic - data for all sections

Catholic titular sees in Asia
Çanakkale Province
Biga District